Staples is a surname of English origin. People with the surname include:

 The Staples Baronets, a family based at Lissan House, County Tyrone
Sir Robert Staples, 12th Baronet (1853-1943), Northern Irish artist
 Abram Penn Staples (1885–1951), American lawyer, legislator, Associate Justice of the Virginia Supreme Court and Attorney General of Virginia
 Chris Staples, American singer-songwriter
 Curtis Staples (born 1976), American former basketball player
 Cyril Staples (1876–1936), Australian-born English cricketer
 Emily Anne Staples (1929-2018), American politician 
 Gary Staples (1940-2021), American politician
 Greg Staples (born 1970), English comic book artist
 Isaac Staples (1816–1898), American businessman
 Jeff Staples (born 1975), Canadian ice hockey player
 Jim Staples (rugby player) (born 1965), English former rugby union footballer
 Justin Staples (born 1989), American football player
 King G. Staples (1851-1910), American politician
 Mavis Staples (born 1939), American singer and activist 
 Peter Staples (born 1947), Australian politician
 Pops Staples (1914–2000), American musician
 Sam Staples (1892–1950), English cricketer
 Todd Staples (born 1963), American politician
 Vince Staples (born 1993), American rapper
 Waller Redd Staples (1826–1897), American lawyer, slave owner, politician and Associate Justice of the Virginia Supreme Court
 William R. Staples, Chief Justice (1854–1856) and Associate Justice of the Rhode Island Supreme Court
 Mark D. Staples, married to Beth Staples

See also
 Justice Staples (disambiguation)